was an aircraft carrier unit of the Imperial Japanese Navy's First Air Fleet.  At the beginning of the Pacific Campaign of World War II, the First Carrier Division consisted of the fleet carriers Akagi and Kaga.  The division participated in the Attack on Pearl Harbor and Indian Ocean Raid.  After Akagi and Kaga were sunk at the Battle of Midway in June 1942, carriers Shōkaku, Zuikaku, and Zuihō were redesignated as the First Carrier Division.

Organization (extract)
{| class="wikitable" 
! Date|| Ships
|-
| 1 April 1928 (original) || ,  and Destroyer Squadron 6: , 
|-
|-
|-
|-
|-
| 10 April 1941 || Akagi, Kaga and Destroyer Squadron 7: , 
|-
|-
| 1 April 1944 || , Shōkaku, Zuikaku|-
| 15 August 1944 || , 
|-
| 15 December 1944 || Amagi, Unryū, 
|-
| 10 April 1945 || dissolved
|-
|}

Commander

The First Carrier Division participated in the largest carrier-to-carrier battle in history, the Battle of the Marianas, and specifically the aircraft carrier Battle of the Philippine Sea (the so-called “Great Marianas Turkey Shoot”) on 19–20 June, where the Japanese naval forces were decisively defeated with heavy and irreplaceable losses to their carrier-borne and land-based aircraft.

ReferencesThe Maru Special series,  (Japan)Ships of the World series'', (Japan)

Further reading

1
Units of the Imperial Japanese Navy Air Service
Military units and formations established in 1928
Military units and formations disestablished in 1945